Bilimbia is a genus of lichen-forming fungi in the family Ramalinaceae.

Taxonomy
Bilimbia was circumscribed by Italian botanist Giuseppe De Notaris in 1846. He included two species, B. hexamera and B. tetramera. Although once widely used by lichenologists, in the 1900s it fell into disuse as authors realized that the name had already been used previously for a genus of phanerogams (as Bilimbia [Rheede] Rchb., published by Ludwig Reichenbach in 1837). Furthermore, Alexander Zahlbruckner transferred the Bilimbia lichens to the genus Bacidia in his two of his works (1926 and 1932). A reassessment of the nomenclatural status of Reichenbach's genus determined that it was not published validly, and De Notaris' Bilimbia was resurrected for use. Molecular phylogenetic evidence suggests that the genus forms a well-supported monophyletic clade within the Ramalinaceae.

De Notaris did not specify a type species when he created the genus. Bruce Fink designated B. hexamera as the type in 1910. However, he used the now-obsolete American Code, and the new nomenclatural rules allow for his typification to be superseded by any later typification, unless the typification has been reaffirmed in the interim. In 1952, Rolf Santesson set B. hexamera as the type. In 1984, Josef Hafellner redesignated B. tetramera as the type, a decision that was followed by Timdal in 1991. However, the species B. hexamera is today considered to be synonymous with Bilimbia sabuletorum, while B. tetramera is now known as Mycobilimbia tetramera. If B. tetramera is assigned as the type of Bilimbia, then Bilimbia becomes a synonym of, and the correct name for Mycobilimbia, which is taxonomically unfeasible. For this reason, a proposal was published in 2020 to conserve the name Bilimbia with B. hexamera as a conserved type.

Species
Bilimbia caloosensis 
Bilimbia caudata 
Bilimbia corcovadensis 
Bilimbia declinis 
Bilimbia granosa 
Bilimbia jeanjeanii 
Bilimbia lobulata 
Bilimbia microcarpa 
Bilimbia pulchra 
Bilimbia ravenelii 
Bilimbia rubidofusca 
Bilimbia rubricosa 
Bilimbia sabuletorum 
Bilimbia sabulosa 
Bilimbia sibiriensis 
Bilimbia suballinita 
Bilimbia sublecanorina 
Bilimbia tetramera

References

Ramalinaceae
Lichen genera
Lecanorales genera
Taxa described in 1846
Taxa named by Giuseppe De Notaris